The Russian Museum of Military Medicine is situated in the center of Saint Petersburg, Russia, in front of Vitebsky Rail Terminal.

History 
The Museum was founded in 1942. Its initial creation was based on collections from several small specialized Russian museums. Today, the museum holds about 210,000 exhibits relating to the history of Russian and world military medicine.

Responding to inquiries from foreign governments, the museum located the documents of more than 100,000 people who were listed in their respective countries as missing in action.

Moreover, the history of medicine reveals an even more ominous trend, which is the tendency toward the progressive dehumanization of medicine itself. Two hundred years ago, during the French-Russian wars, military doctors impartially treated both their own soldiers and the soldiers of the enemy. The Russian military doctor, Christophor Oppel, was awarded for his service on the battlefield by both the Emperors Alexander I of Russia and Napoleon I of France at the same time! Now, 200 years later, at the beginning of the 21st century, military doctors participate in interrogation of the enemy with the intention of securing critical information with the aid of medicines. Furthermore, there exist some attempts to scientifically substantiate it, contending that the interests of the nation and government are superior to the interest of an individual (see e.g.).

See also 
 Kirov Military Medical Academy

Literature 
 Budko A.A., Bergman M.D. (Будко А.А., Бергман М.Д. ) The Fundamentals of the Conception of the Military Medicine Museum // The Military Medicine Journal (Voenno-Meditsinski Zhurnal - Военно-медицинский журнал, in Russian), 2007, Vol. 328, No 6 (June 2007), pp. 80 - 84.
 Budko A.A., Ivanova L.D. (Будко А.А., Иванова Л.Д.) The Military Medicine Museum is the Principal Guardian of the Historical Traditions of the Russian Medicine and Its Military Medical Service // Asclepius (Асклепий, in Russian), 2005, Vol. 8, No 1, pp. 46 - 57.

References

External links
 Museum of Military Medicine website

Medical museums in Russia
Military history of Russia
Military medicine in the Soviet Union
Science museums in Saint Petersburg
Military and war museums in Saint Petersburg
Cultural heritage monuments of regional significance in Saint Petersburg